Green Mill may refer to:-
The Green Mill Cocktail Lounge, Uptown, Chicago
Green's Mill, Sneinton, a windmill in Nottinghamshire, United Kingdom
De Groene Molen, Joure, a windmill in Friesland, the Netherlands
Green Mill, a Pizza chain from St. Paul, MN.